is a steamship operating for the Canadian Pacific Railway on Okanagan Lake from 1893 to 1919.

SS Aberdeen may also refer to:

 , an innovative British steamship built for the Aberdeen Line in 1881
 , a coastal whale catcher operating out of Gray's Harbor from the Canada–US border south to Cape Blanco in Oregon
 SS Aberdeen Victory, a  merchant ship operated during the latter stages of World War II, later commissioned into the United States Navy as

See also 
 Aberdeen (disambiguation)